Canmore General Hospital is a medical facility located in Canmore, Alberta, Canada. Alberta Health Services is responsible for the operations of the hospital. It is a referral centre for surgical services within the province of Alberta. It contains 25 acute care and 23 long-term care beds. The hospital employs 350 staff with 93 physicians having staff privileges. The hospital primarily refers to the Foothills Medical Centre in Calgary. Nonprofit funding is provided by the Canmore and Area Health Care Foundation.

History 

On 25 April 2017, the government of Alberta announced that $1.8 million worth of renovations were being conducted at the hospital.

Services
Emergency
Diagnostic imaging (CT, Xray, Ultrasound)
Endoscopy
General surgery
Inpatient medical care
Laboratory
Physical therapy
Plastic surgery
Respiratory therapy

Obstetrics
The only hospital in the Bow Valley with maternity ward after Banff - Mineral Springs Hospital closed its obstetrics department on March 25, 2013, along with the vascular and plastic surgery services.

References 

Hospital buildings completed in 1984
Hospitals in Alberta
Canmore, Alberta
Heliports in Canada
Certified airports in Alberta
1984 establishments in Alberta
Hospitals established in 1984